FVC may refer to:
 Fair Vote Canada, an electoral reform advocacy group in Canada
 Ferraz de Vasconcelos (CPTM), a railway station in Brazil
 Financial vehicle corporation in the European Union
 Fingerprint Verification Competition
 FIRST Vex Challenge, a high school robotics competition
 Forced vital capacity
 Fortuneo–Vital Concept, a French cycling team
 Forth Valley College in Scotland
 Fraser Valley College, now the University of the Fraser Valley, in British Columbia, Canada